Roger Dowdeswell (born 16 February 1944) is a former professional tennis player from Zimbabwe. He is the elder brother of Colin Dowdeswell.

Playing career
Dowdeswell made the second round of all four Grand Slam tournaments during his career. He played Davis Cup tennis for Rhodesia in 1965, against Yugoslavia. In his singles rubbers he lost to Boro Jovanović and Niki Pilic, the same two that would beat he and Roy Stilwell in the doubles.

Coaching
Dowdeswell, who is now the Tennis Director of the Manhattan Plaza Racquet Club, has coached the American and New Zealand junior Davis Cup teams.

References

1944 births
Living people
Rhodesian male tennis players
Zimbabwean male tennis players
Sportspeople from Nairobi